David Paton (born 1949) is a Scottish bassist, guitarist and singer.

David Paton may also refer to:
 David Paton (architect) (1801–1882), Scots-born architect known for North Carolina State Capitol
 David Paton (artist) (fl. 1660–1670), Scottish portrait miniature artist
 Dave Paton (canoeist), American slalom canoeist, see 1989 Canoe Slalom World Cup
 David Paton (doctor) (1912–2008), British Army medical officer
 David Paton (footballer) (1943–2020), Scottish footballer for Southampton F.C.
 David Paton (missionary) (1913-1992), a British missionary to China
 David Paton (ophthalmologist) (born 1930), founder of an ophthalmological charity
 David C. Paton, conservation ecologist, ornithologist, academic, and author

See also
 David Patten (disambiguation)
 David Patton (disambiguation)